General elections were held in Costa Rica on 13 February 1944. Teodoro Picado Michalski of the Victory Bloc won the presidential election with 75.1% of the vote. Voter turnout was 43.2%.

Background
Being deputy and president of the Congress, Teodoro Picado Michalski was officially invested as presidential candidate of the National Republican Party on May 2, 1942, two years before the elections.

Having been elected deputy communist leader Manuel Mora in the mid-term elections of 1942, Mora was approached by businessman Jorge Hine (who was rumored as a possible candidate of the right-wing opposition in the next elections). Hine tried to enlist Mora in a coup d'état that the conservatives were plotting against Calderón, but Mora declined and the attack was never carried out nor did Hine appear as a candidate. Mora and the communist leadership, on the other hand, were in negotiations with the government and the Catholic Church led by Monsignor Víctor Sanabria Martínez. As part of the strategy of appeasement to the Church the Communist Party is formally dissolved and re-founded under the name Popular Vanguard Party. Consulted Monsignor Sanabria by Mora on whether there is an inconvenience in that Catholics militate in the new party, Sanabria responds that having studied their plan of government Christians have no moral dilemma in voting for the party.

The opposition nominates former President León Cortés Castro, formerly Calderón's political godfather and who had resolutely supported him when Calderón was a candidate in 1940, now known enemies. Cortés was known for his fascist sympathies which was used in campaign against him, especially because the country was at that time officially at war against Nazi Germany and the Axis powers since 1941. This probably catapulted the Communists to ally with Calderón, being that the Popular Fronts to stop fascism were a guideline of Moscow. In any case, Cortés had the support of the richest conservative and business groups (which at some point gravitated around Hine) while Teodoro Picado became a candidate backed by the popular bases of Calderonism, Communism and the Catholicism.

Campaign
The campaign was quite harsh due to the increasing tensions between the ruling party and the opposition. There were terrorist attacks perpetrated by both sides.

In general, the ruling party focused on highlighting the social achievements of Calderón's administration (who strongly supported the candidate Picado) and promised to deepen them, threatening to reach power Cortes would abolish them by having on their side the most reactionary segments and conservatives of the oligarchy and maintained the accusations of Fascist. Cortes, meanwhile, tried to get rid of these accusations and promised efficiency in public administration. The Democrats also accused the government of political persecution, closure of media opponents of the government and dissolution of political meetings of the Party. Although Mora also accused of threats against his person and aggressions against his supporters by the cortesistas.

The violence during the elections left one dead in Sabanilla and three in Llano Grande. Three days later, while the Picadista triumph was being held, the presidential candidacy of Rafael Ángel Calderón Guardia was announced for the next elections.

Results

President

References

1944 elections in Central America
1944 in Costa Rica
Elections in Costa Rica